Adolf (Adolph) Ulric Grill (19 March 17521 October 1797) was a Swedish ironworks owner and scientific collector of animals and fossils for his cabinet of curiosities at Söderfors Manor, Tierp Municipality, Uppsala County, Sweden.

Family 
One of the notable Grill family, Adolf Ulric was the son of Claes Grill and Anna Johanna Grill. He married his cousin, Anna Johanna (1753–1809) in Stockholm on 7June 1778, they had one son who died at an early age. At the time of his marriage, he lived in the Grill House in Stockholm. He and his wife moved to Söderfors when he inherited the ironworks and manor from his father in 1767.

Ironworks owner 
Grill was a dedicated and hands-on owner of the ironworks at Söderfors, who supervised the operation and managed the books. Initially the factory's main products were anchors but with additions and improvements to the facilities he expanded into the production of wrought and pig iron amongst other goods. The products from the ironworks were of good quality and production peaked in 1780.

Collector 

Like his father, he was a natural scientist and he collected mounted animals, fossils, minerals and plants in a museum, started in 1783, at the Söderfors manor. The first specimens were collected in the vicinity of Söderfors. After two years Grill moved on to the birds of the archipelago. He was able to use his connections through his relatives in the trading houses, to send for specimens from Greenland and China. The collections were also increased during his travels and on a journey to England in 1788, he traded a mounted moose for 60 rare birds.

In 1786, Grill built a separate house at the manor for the zoological collection. At that time it contained 116 mounted mammals, 600 birds, 700 seashells and 39 fishes. The collection was displayed as a full size diorama, the centerpiece being a cliff with mounted lions, tigers with cubs, leopards and a number of other animals surrounding the cliff, the largest being a sirenia. The museum was the largest collection in the Nordic countries at that time, it also received some international recognition. In 1793, Grill became a member, and preses in 1795, of the Royal Swedish Academy of Sciences for his work with the museum. In 1828, the collection was donated to the Academy by the Grill family. As a tribute to him, the giant oarfish (Gymnetrus Grillii), was named after him.

Builder 

Grill paid for the building of a church in Söderfors that was inaugurated on 30September 1792. Three years later, at a time of crop failure and famine in Söderfors, he started the construction of an English garden at the manor to provide jobs for the farmers in Söderfors and the neighboring Hedesunda socken. As a result, the park, a main feature in Söderfors, is sometimes called the Hedesunda brödkaka (the Hedesunda bread biscuit). Since 1998, the park has been included in the listed buildings of Söderfors.

Grill was known as a music lover and amateur composer. Wherever he lived, he organized well attended concert nights, with musicians invited from Stockholm. In 1772, he became a member of the Royal Swedish Academy of Music.

Notes

References

Further reading

External links 
Website of the Grill family
Godegård archive at the Nordic Museum
SOIC archive at the Gothenburg University Library
Grill Family from Sweden and the Netherlands and their Chinese Armorial Services

1752 births
1797 deaths
18th-century Swedish businesspeople
Swedish merchants
Members of the Royal Swedish Academy of Sciences
Swedish East India Company people
Businesspeople from Stockholm
Adolf Ulric